Simon Tchobang Tchoya (31 August 1951 – 7 September 2007) was a Cameroonian football goalkeeper who played for Cameroon in the 1982 FIFA World Cup. He also played for Eclair Douala, Avion Entrelec Douala, Dynamo Douala and Dihep di Nkam Yabassi.

Career
Born in Douala, Tchobang began playing football as a goalkeeper for Eclair Douala in the 1970s.

References

External links
FIFA profile

1951 births
2007 deaths
Footballers from Douala
Cameroonian footballers
Cameroon international footballers
Association football goalkeepers
1982 FIFA World Cup players
1982 African Cup of Nations players